Andre Bilder is a studio album by Vigleik Storaas Trio. It was released September 18, 1997, by the label Curling Legs.

Reception 

The trio was awarded Spellemannprisen for Bilder (1995), and this follow-up album is of the same high quality. Accompanied by Johannes Eick (double bass) and Per Oddvar Johansen (drums) they opens the ball with a nod to Thelonious Monk in «Monk´S Stream». The material on Andre Bilder is for the most composed by Storaas and gives a perfect platform exploration of the piano trio format of today.

The review by Terje Mosnes of the Norwegian newspaper Dagbladet awarded the album dice 5,

Honors 
Spellemannprisen 1997 in the class Jazz

Track listing 
«Monk´s Stream» (6:20)
«Mot At» (5:56)
«Senket» (6:30)
«Kramm» (3:39)
«Filling Up» (5:26)
«Awaiting B» (5:57)
«The Dream» (4:47)
«Alt Pluss Elleve» (3:32) Johannes Eick
«Waltz» (6:46)
«Kart» (8:4) Per Oddvar Johansen

Personnel 
Piano – Vigleik Storaas
Double bass – Johannes Eick
Drums & percussion – Per Oddvar Johansen

Credits 
Produced by the trio and Jan Erik Kongshaug
Executive Producers: Curling Legs Productions DA
Recorded and mixed at Rainbow Studios, Oslo, October 7 & 8, 1996
Engineered and mixed by Jan Erik Kongshaug
Cover Design: Mcleanjacket@graf.no
Cover and liner photos by Johs Bøe
Supported by Norsk Kassettavgiftsfond

Notes  
All compositions by Vigleik Storaas except where noted

References 

Spellemannprisen winners
Vigleik Storaas albums
1997 albums